Police Gazette, or some variation thereof has been the title of several magazines:

Police Gazette (Great Britain and Ireland), first published in 1772
Cleave's Weekly Police Gazette, published between 1836 and 1838 in London.
Penny Sunday Times and People's Police Gazette, published in 1840-1842 in London by E. Lloyd at Shoreditch and Strand
National Police Gazette, an American magazine published between 1845 and 1977
Victoria Police Gazette, published in Australia between 1853 and 1870

Other
Police Gazette (painting) an abstract painting by Willem de Kooning.
Police Gazette, the working title of James Ellroy's 2009 novel Blood's a Rover